Events from the year 2020 in the British Virgin Islands.

Incumbents

Governor: Augustus Jaspert
Premier: Andrew Fahie

Events

January
 20 January - House of Assembly representative for the 6th District, Alvera Maduro-Caines "crosses the floor", leaving the opposition NDP to join the ruling VIP.  Politicians crossing the floor is relatively common in the Territory.

March
 25 March - The British Virgin Islands confirmed its first two cases of COVID-19.  One was a visitor from Europe and one was a visitor from New York.

April
 5 April - The Territory implements a 24 hour per day lockdown for a period of 14 days due to the 2020 coronavirus pandemic in the British Virgin Islands.
 18 April 
 The Territory suffers its first death from COVID-19.
 The Territory imposes a 7% tax on all money transfer services out of the Territory.
 19 April - The Territory-wide 24 hour lockdown is extended by seven days.

May
 24 May - Former first lady, Idris O'Neal OBE (wife of Ralph O'Neal) dies.
 26 May - Health Authorities announce that there are now zero confirmed cases of Covid-19 in the Territory, but warned that the fight against the virus is "not over".

June
 3 June - The report of the Auditor General in relation to the Government's controversial investment in BVI Airways is published.
8 June – An American commercial fisherman is arrested for illegal entry, unregistered and unlicensed fishing, and failure to arrive at a customs port.
 15 June - Controversy arises as a local media outlet publishes a cartoon of Governor Augustus Jaspert standing on the neck of a local media personality, in imitation of the murder of George Floyd.

August
 3 August - Government issues a directive barring work permit holders and work permit exempt persons from returning to the Territory indefinitely.
 14 August - Curfew relating to Covid-19 pandemic ends after five months.
 21 August 
 Gambling laws are liberalised in the Territory pursuant to the new Gaming and Betting Control Act 2020.
 Nine new cases of Covid-19 diagnosed, leading the Government to reimpose curfew restrictions.  The rise in infections was blamed by the Government on people re-entering the Territory illegally from the neighbouring U.S. Virgin Islands to evade mandatory quarantine restrictions.

September
 21 September - Government announces a proposed 1 December re-opening of the Territory for tourist visitors.
 22 September - Government announces its commitment to "implementing publicly accessible registers of company beneficial ownership" for the Territory.

October
 8 October - Government warns the public of an apparent Dengue fever outbreak in the Territory.

November
 6 November - A man is shot dead in the Baugher's Bay area of Tortola.
 10 November - A serving police officer is arrested in the largest drugs bust in the Territory's history - around 2,300 kilogrammes.

Deaths
24 May - Idris O'Neal OBE (wife of Ralph O'Neal)

See also
2020 in the Caribbean

Footnotes

 
2020s in the British Virgin Islands
British Virgin Islands